Three ships of the United States Navy have been named Artemis after Artemis, the Olympian goddess known to the Romans as Diana.

 , was a patrol craft commissioned on 17 October 1917.
 USS Artemis (ID-2187), was in commission April—October 1919.
 , an attack cargo ship and lead ship of her class was laid down on 23 November 1943 and launched on 20 May 1944.

See also

Sources
 

United States Navy ship names